is a Japanese football player. He is the younger brother of Gōtoku and Noriyoshi Sakai.

Club statistics
Updated to 23 February 2016.

References

External links

Profile at Fukushima United FC

1996 births
Living people
Association football people from Niigata Prefecture
Japanese footballers
Albirex Niigata players
Fukushima United FC players
Association football defenders
Lüneburger SK Hansa players
VfR Aalen players
FV Illertissen players
J1 League players
J3 League players
J.League U-22 Selection players
Regionalliga players
Japanese expatriate footballers
Expatriate footballers in Germany
Japanese expatriate sportspeople in Germany